Bengt Edvin Axel Grive, né Gustafsson (21 March 1921 – 17 September 2003) was a Swedish sports commentator, journalist and author.

Career
Grive was born in Stockholm, Sweden, the son of Edvin Gustafsson and Elsa (née Lindström). Grive worked as a firefighter in Stockholm during a few years in the 1940s.

Grive worked at Aftonbladet newspaper from 1951 to 1956, and performed as a variety show artist from 1953 to 1960. In 1960, he became a reporter for Sveriges Television, where he worked until 1990 when he became a freelance journalist. In 1993, he started working for Eurosport when the channel expanded its broadcast to the Nordics. He got to commentate both tennis and ski jumping. He also became a mentor for amongst others Chris Härenstam and Niklas Holmgren.

He is best known for commentating Björn Borg's tennis finals in Wimbledon during the 1970s and 1980s. He also commentated table tennis, figure skating and football. He was part of the Swedish elite in table tennis, during a few year and won the Swedish championship in the sport in 1951.

Personal life
In 1945, Grive married Marta Svensson (1923–2005), the daughter of Ivar Svensson, a merchant, and Linnéa (née Eriksson). They had one daughter, Madeleine Grive (born 1955), a journalist.

Bibliography

References

External links

1921 births
2003 deaths
Swedish sports broadcasters
Swedish male table tennis players
Journalists from Stockholm